Penn Township is a township in Johnson County, Iowa, USA.

History
Penn Township was organized in 1846. It is named for William Penn.

References

Townships in Johnson County, Iowa
Townships in Iowa
1846 establishments in Iowa Territory